Wafaa: A Deadly Love Story is a 2008 Indian film starring Rajesh Khanna, Laila Khan and Sahib Chopra. This movie was written by Salim Raza and directed by Rakesh Sawant. It was released on 19 December 2008 worldwide by Dimension Pictures.

Wafaa was promoted as a comeback film for Rajesh Khanna in lead role. The movie was not directed well, nor the story well portrayed on screen which made it a box office failure and received mostly negative reviews for the performance of the heroine and supporting casts. Though critics observed that Khanna's dialogue delivery and body language remained similar to the various classics he has starred in over the years from 1966 to 1996.

Cast
 Rajesh Khanna - Amritlal Chopra
 Sudesh Berry
 Laila Khan - Beena
 Saahib
 Tinu Anand

Music
The songs were performed by prominent singers of the industry. Playback singers include Mika Singh, Udit Narayan and Kumar Sanu. The music was composed by Ravi Pawar and Sayed Ahmed, and the lyrics were penned by Sahb Ilhabadi.

Reception
The movie was a box office failure and got mostly negative reviews.

References

External links
 

2008 films
2000s Hindi-language films